Punjabi cinema is the Punjabi-language film industry centered around the Indian state of Punjab, and based in Amritsar and Mohali.

The cinema of Punjab has its beginnings with the 1928 production of Ajj dia thia, the earliest feature film produced in the region. The first sound film, Heer Ranjha, using the sound-on-disc technology, was released in 1932. Since then, many films have been produced in Punjabi cinema, a number of which have received international recognition. Many actors and filmmakers started their careers in Punjabi films, a number of whom have acquired international reputations, and a number of whom have found greater financial benefits in careers in larger film producing industries.

History

Film operations started in the 1920s in Lahore, the provincial capital of British Punjab. The first silent film, Daughters of Today, was released in 1924 in Lahore; the city had nine operational cinema houses. Movies shown at these cinemas were mostly produced in Bombay and Calcutta, and seldom from Hollywood and London.

Daughters of Today was a brainchild of G.K. Mehta, a former officer with the North-Western Railways who, much like H. S. Bhatavdekar, had imported a camera into the country. Mehta continued to produce newsreel coverage for companies abroad and delved into further film projects but his dedication gave way when he promptly left the film industry for more profitable ventures. But it was to be later in 1929–1930, when Abdur Rashid Kardar's Husn Ka Daku was released, that the film industry had established in essence in Lahore's Bhati Gate locality. Kardar, a professional calligraphist, was accompanied by his fellow-artist and friend Muhammad Ismail, who would make the posters for his films.

Sound films (1930s–1946)
Although Kardar had worked with G.K. Mehta on The Daughters of Today, he felt he needed to continue working and stay active in the industry. Alongside Ismail, he sold all his belongings to set up a studio and a production company under the name United Players Corporation, in 1928. Set up at Ravi Road (now Timber Market), the duo hired actors to work with them on their projects. Shooting was mainly done in daylight and limited their productivity, but the area they encompassed was enriched with locations, including important landmarks.

The duo modeled their work on American and English films with influences not just prevalent in actors' attires but the movie titles and expressed a desire to seek all means necessary to make a sound film of their own. Actors who worked for the studio included Hiralal, Gul Hamid, Nazir, Pran Sikhand, Kaushalya Devi, Gulzaar, Mumtaaz and Ahmed Deen. Husn Ka Daku, also known as Mysterious Eagle, Kardar's directorial début would firmly add him into the directors guild. Produced by Hakim Ram Prasad, the 1932 released Heer Ranjha, originally titled Hoor Punjab, was the first Punjabi sound film ever made. Hakim provided the studio with the equipment necessary to direct the sound film, marked as the last directed by Kardar in Lahore, starring M. Ismail while launching the careers of Rafiq Ghaznavi, Nazeer and Anwari.

Produced by Indira Movie Tone, Krishna Dev Mehra released his directorial début, Pind Di Kudi, in 1935. The sound film, Pind Di Kudi was produced in Calcutta and released in Lahore and introduced young Noor Jahan as an actor and a playback singer. Due to the success of this film, interest in Punjabi films started to escalate; therefore, in 1938, with the assistance of Madan Mohan Mehra, K.D. Mehra released his second Punjabi sound film, Heer Sial.

Studios started to open and many actors, filmmakers and technicians shifted from Bombay and Calcutta to Lahore. Prominent names included Shanta Apte, Motilal, Chandra Mohan, Hiralal, Noor Jehan, Mumtaz Shanti, Wali, Syed Attahullah Shah Hashmi, Krishna Kumar, and Shanker Hussain. Baldev Raj Chopra, later known as a director, started from the Punjabi film industry in Lahore, where he operated a film magazine called the Cine Herald. Likewise, Ramanand Sagar, later a director, was associated with the Evening News and Syed Attahullah Shah Hashmi worked for the film newspaper, Adakar.

Bhati Gate is known to have produced some of most notable actors, writers and artists, but with tensions running swift towards the independence of Pakistan and India in 1947, most of the actors traveled into areas that are now a part of modern India. The industry left in Lahore would later be termed as Lollywood, a portmanteau of Lahore and Hollywood.

Post–Punjab partition

In 1947, the British province of Punjab was partitioned between India and Pakistan. West Punjab became part of Pakistan and East Punjab became part of India. This compelled Punjabi film actors, filmmakers and musicians to work in the Bombay industry, including actors such as K.L. Saigal, Prithviraj Kapoor, Dilip Kumar and Dev Anand and singers such as Mohammed Rafi, Noorjahan and Shamshad Begum. In 1948, Roop K. Shorey directed the first Punjabi film following the partition of Punjab. Other notable films of the late 1940s included Lachhi (1949), Mundri (1949) and Pheray (1949).

1950s–1960s
Attempts were made to keep Punjabi cinema alive in this period. Filmmakers made films like Posti, Do Lachhian and Bhangra with some success but were not able to revive Punjabi cinema. Songs from the films would run for months and years on the radio resulting in a long-term audience for the films. Post-partition, the trend of comedies continued. One of the hit comedies was Mulkh Raj Bhakhri's Bhangra (1958), starring Sundar and Nishi. It was remade by director Mohan Bhakhri as Jatti in 1980 with Mehar Mittal and Aparna Chowdhry, and it was again a commercial success. The music from the film was by Hansraj Behl with lyrics by Verma Malik. Songs sung by Shamshad and Rafi like "Batti balkay banere utte rakhdi han, rah bhul na jave chann mera" and "Chitte dand hasnon nayion rehnde" were widespread hits. Johnny Walker (1957) was a hit.

The big-budget romantic Punjabi film by director Padam Prakash Maheshwary, Satluj De Kande, was released in 1964. This film starred Balraj Sahni, Nishi, Wasti, and Mirza Musharraf, with music by Hansraj Behl. This was the only Punjabi film starring Balraj Sahni. It was a major hit and earned a National Film Award. Satluj de Kande was telecasted three times on the public TV channel Doordarshan in India. In 1969 the religious film Nanak Nam Jahaz Hai starring Prithviraj Kapoor, I. S. Johar, Vimmi, Som Dutt, Nishi, Suresh, and David Abraham was released. The film was the first really major successful Punjabi film in post-independent India, with a major cultural impact on Punjabi Sikhs at home and abroad, and is credited with the revival of the Punjabi film industry in India. People stood in kilometre-long lines to buy a ticket for the film.

1970s
After the success of Nanak Nam Jahaz Hai, films were released in huge numbers. Hindi actors of Punjabi descent became interested in Punjabi films. Kankan De Ohle (Dharmendra, Asha Parekh and Ravindra Kapoor) and Nanak Dukhiya Sab Sansar (Dara Singh, Balraj Sahni, Ram Mohan and Asha Sachdev) were released in 1970. 1971 saw no major releases. In 1972, Dara Singh starred with Prithviraj Kapoor in Mele Mitran De. Man Jeete Jag Jeet, a religious film starring Sunil Dutt, Radha Saluja and Ranjeet, was a major release of 1973. In 1974, Do Sher (Dharmendra and Rajendra Kumar), Bhagat Dhanna Jatt (Dara Singh and Feroz Khan), Sacha Mera Roop Hai (Manmohan Krishan) and Dukh Bhanjan Tera Naam (Shaminder Singh and Radha Saluja) were released. The most successful was Dukh Bhanjan Tera Naam, due to the wide appeal of its religious historical setting and appearances by Bollywood actors including Sunil Dutt, Rajendra Kumar, Dharmendra, Johnny Walker, Ranjeet and Dara Singh.

Teri Meri Ik Jindri (1975) starred Dharmendra and introduced his cousin Veerendra. Many films were released in 1976: Daaj, Giddha, Main Papi Tum Bakhshanhaar, Papi Tarey Anek, Santo Banto, Sardar-E-Azam, Sawa Lakh Se Ek Ladaun, Taakra, and Yamla Jatt. Sawa Lakh Se Ek Ladaun was the biggest hit and starred Dara Singh in the main lead; Rajesh Khanna made a special appearance as the Qawal. The film ran into conflict with the Sikh political parties as the film had Fauj-i-Khas soldiers wearing fake beards. The year 1977 was not a major one for the Punjabi film industry. Jai Mata Di, Saal Solvan Chadya, Sat Sri Akal, and Shaheed Kartar Singh Sarabha were released, amongst others. Saal Solvan Chadya was a highlight because of the cameo appearance by Rekha. Sat Sri Akal was another hit film. It starred Sunil Dutt, Shatrughan Sinha, and Premnath. In 1978 Udeekan, Dhyani Bhagat, Jai Mata Sheranwali, and Jindri Yar Di were released. The drama Udeekan was a hit. Walayati Babu, the first ever remake in Punjabi cinema, was released in 1978. The film was remade from the Punjabi film of the same name by Johnny Walker; it featured a special appearance by Amitabh Bachchan and Mehar Mittal played the main lead. 1979 was a big year: Guru Manio Granth, Jatt Punjabi, Kunwara Mama, Sukhi Pariwar, and Til Til Dalekha were released. The religious film Guru Manio Granth was an instant hit. Jatt Punjabi had a big cast and a special appearance by Manoj Kumar. Til Til Da Lekha starred Rajesh Khanna as the main lead hero and Mehar Mittal played the comedian's role; the film became a golden jubilee hit at the box office. Til Til Dalekha was the second Punjabi movie of Rajesh Khanna and his first film as the lead hero in Punjabi films. It won the Punjab State Government award for best story writer and second best feature film of 1979. The first Punjabi mystery film, Vangaar (The Challenge), was released but it failed to become a hit.

1980s
Chann Pardesi, the first Punjabi film to win the national award, was released in 1980, and was the biggest hit of that year. It starred Raj Babbar, Rama Vij, Amrish Puri, Om Puri, and Kulbhushan Kharbanda. Fauji Chacha had veteran Bollywood actor Sanjeev Kumar in the lead. A remake of Mulkh Raj Bhakhri's 1958 film Bhangra came out in 1980 from director Mohan Bhakhri. The film was titled Jatti, and starred Sundar, Nishi, Mehar Mittal, and Aparna Chowdhry. As with the original, the remake was a tremendous success.

1981 had only one hit: Balbiro Bhabhi. This film had Veerendra in the lead role. Sarpanch starred Veerendra. In 1983, many movies were released, with Putt Jattan De being the biggest commercially. Veerendra had another hit in 1984 with the film Yaari Jatt Di. This was the first Punjabi film to have more than half its footage shot in the United Kingdom. Mamla Garbar Hai was a hit for actor Gurdas Mann. The film's songs were especially loved.

Two hit films of 1985 were Mohammad Sadiq's Guddo and Veerendra's Vairi, Ucha Dar Babe Nanak Da was also in 1985, it is religious film that established Gurdas Mann as a star.. Long Da Lishkara was the big hit of 1986, starring Raj Babbar, Gurdas Mann, Om Puri, and Nina Deol. In 1987 Veerendra starred in Patola and Jor Jatt Da. Punjab was shaken with the assassination of Veerendra by gunshot during the filming of Jatt Tey Zameen. The death opened the door for supporting actors including Guggu Gill and Yograj Singh to take leading roles.

1988 had Patola as one of the major release. In 1989 came the critically acclaimed Marhi Da Deeva. The film starred Raj Babbar, Pankaj Kapur, Kanwaljit Singh, Parikshit Sahni, and Deepti Naval.

1990s
In 1990 Qurbani Jatt Di was released, starring Guggu Gill, Yograj Singh, Gurdas Mann, Dharmendra, Raj Babbar and Priti Sapru. The film was directed by Preeti Sapru herself, and did well at the box office. A second important release was Dushmani Di Agg, the last film of Veerendra. It also starred Gurdas Mann and Priti Sapru, and was successful at the box office. In 1991 the major film Anakh Jattan Di starred Daljeet Kaur and Guggu Gill. It was the first movie where the audience really accepted ex-villain Guggu Gill as a hero. The film was followed by films like Jor Jatt Da, which managed to recover its cost. Badla Jatti Da was the major success of the year. It starred Guggu Gill, Yograj Singh in a villain role, and Aman Noorie. Udeekan Saun Diyan garnered critical acclaim, but was not a commercial success. Sounh Menoo Punjab Di, starring Satish Kaul, Rama Vij, Mehar Mittal, and Pal Randhawa was also one of the releases of 1991. The film was directed by Sukhdev Ahluwalia, one of the most successful directors of Punjwood, and had music by Surinder Kohli.

Vaisakhi, starring Deep Dhillon and Sunita Dheer, was released in 1991 to critical acclaim, but did not succeed commercially. Jatt Jeona Morh was a major hit that year, and made Guggu Gill a superstar. Also released was Yograj Singh's Jagga Daku (1991 film), which did moderately well. Dil Da Mamla, starring Guggu Gill and Amar Noori, did poorly at the box office.

1993 had films like Jatt Sucha Singh Soorma (with Yograj Singh and Neena Sidhu), Mirza Sahiban (starring Guggu Gill), Lalkara Jatt Da, and Saali Adhi Gharwali. These films managed to do adequately at the box office, but were not major successes. Preeti Sapru's Mehndi Shagnan Di, starring Malkit Singh, Hansraj Hans, Preeti Sapru, and Yograj Singh, lost money. Kudi Canada Di starring Yograj Singh also did poorly.

Kachehri (1994) starred Gurdas Mann, Yograj Singh, and others. The film was praised by critics, was a commercial success, and won a national award. A second release was Tabahi, starring newcomer Vishal Singh; it was the blockbuster hit of the year. Guggu Gill's Vairi did quite well at the box office, but Jigra Jatt Da, with Yograj Singh as the villain, did poorly at the box office.

Kimi Verma starred in Naseebo and Qahar in 1995 to critical acclaim, but not commercial success. Naseebo managed to recover its costs. Pratigya, starring Guggu Gill, Gurdas Maan, Preeti Sapru, and Dara Singh, did well at the box office. Zaildaar (Yograj Singh), Nain Preeto De (Yograj Singh), and Sir Dhad Di Baazi did well. Gurdas Mann's Baghawat did not. Jakhmi Jagirdar and Mera Punjab amongst others also did poorly that year.

Punjabi cinema began to decline in 1996. Only the film Sukha (starring Vishal Singh) did well at the box office. Deson Pardeson, Dhee Jatt Di (Upasana Singh, Gurkirtan, and Shivinder Mahal), Vichoda (Yograj Singh), Gawahi Jatt Di, and Jorawar all did poorly at the box office. Dara Singh's Vindoo and Farha's Rabb Diyan Rakhan also fared poorly.

Films of 1997 (Mela, Truck Driver, Sardari, Preetan De Pehredaar, and Pachtaawa) all failed to make a profit. Even Guggu Gill's films were not successful. Train to Pakistan was filmed in a mixture of Hindi and Punjabi, and was later dubbed into Punjabi for film festivals.

In 1998, Purja Purja Kat Mare with Guggu Gill, Laali with Dara Singh, Ravinder Maan, and Vishal, and Dildaara with Kalbhooshan Kharbanda and Tanuja did not make money. Even big budget films like Guru Gobind Singh did poorly. The critically acclaimed film Main Maa Punjab Dee (directed by Balwant Dullat) won a National Award. The film Main Maa Punjab dee has been shown repeatedly on national television. The year ended on a positive note as Jaspal Bhatti's Mahaul Theek Hai became an instant hit of Punjabi cinema. It was the first big hit since Jatt Jeona Morh (1991) and Badla Jatti Da (1992).

Punjabi films were more successful in 1999.  Mahaul Theek Hai, Shaheed-e-Mohabbat Boota Singh with Gurdas Maan and Divya Dutta was a critical and commercial success. Muqqadar, Tera Mera Pyar, Nadiyon Vichde Neer, Door Nahin Nankana, and Ishq Nachave Gali Gali (Randeep Virender, Manjeet Kullar, Deepak Saraf, Neeru Singh, and Surinder Sharma) all did poorly at the box office. Rajniti, which was also made in Hindi, failed to make money. Raj Babbar's Shaheed Udham Singh did well towards the end of the year. There were only two major hits that year, Shaheed e Mohabbat and Shaheed Udham Singh.

2000s
In 2000 there was just a single release: Dard Pardesan De, starring Avinash Wadhawan, Upasana Singh, Paramveer, and Deepshikha, which fared poorly in Punjab, but did very well overseas. Sikandra and Jagira were released in 2001. Avinash Wadhawan and Ayesha Jhulka starred in Khalsa Mero Roop Hai Khaas, which was released to the overseas market but not in Punjab.

In 2002 Jee Ayan Nu was released, featuring singer-turned-actor Harbhajan Mann and directed by Manmohan Singh. The movie was made on a big budget for Punjwood – 9 million, as compared to the more typical 20–25 million. It was very successful. This was a turning point in the revival of Punjabi cinema.

Badla came out in 2003. Asa Nu Maan Watna Da was released in 2004, again with actor Harbhajan Mann and director Manmohan Singh.

Jija Ji, Des Hoyaa Pardes, Main Tu Assi Tussi, Yaaran Naal Baharan, and Nalaik were released in 2005. Dil Apna Punjabi (again pairing Harbhajan and director Manmohan), Ek Jind Ek Jaan (introducing Prabhleen Sandhu), Mannat (directed and written by Gurbir Singh Grewal, having Jimmy Sheirgill and introducing Kulraj Randhawa), and Waris Shah: Ishq Daa Waaris came out in 2006. Kambdi Kalai, a Punjabi diaspora movie based out of the United States, came out in 2006. Rustam-e-Hind and Mitti Wajan Mardi (with Harbhajan and Manmohan) were released in 2007.

A significant number of movies were produced in 2008: Hashar: A Love Story (introducing Gurleen Chopra), Yaariyan, Mera Pind, Lakh pardesi hoye, Heaven on earth, and Sat sri akal. In 2009, Jag Jeodeye Deh Mele became a hit, and Tera Mera Ki Rishta with Jimmy Shergill and Kulraj Randhawa was a hit. But the biggest earner of all the Punjabi films was Manmohan Singh's Munde U.K. De with Jimmy Shergill and Gurpreet Ghuggi.

Munde U.K. De broke the record of Dil Apna Punjabi which was also directed by Manmohan Singh and became the biggest earner of all the Punjabi movies.

Mehndi Wale Hath (2006), written and directed by Harinder Gill and with the new-star cast of Goldie Somal, Gavie Chahal, and Prableen, was a hit film in east Punjab territory.

2010s
In 2010, 16 movies were released. Mel Karade Rabba starring Jimmy Shergill, Gippy Grewal later broke all records and grossed 110 million net, becoming the highest-grossing Punjabi film ever. Babbu Maans Ekam – Son of Soil was released in April and was a smash hit. It brought British-punjabi actress Mandy Takhar to the industry. Jawani Zindabad, written and directed by Harinder Gill and starring the famous Punjabi singer Raj Barar, Pooja Kanwal, Guggu Gill, and Gurkirtan, was released in March 2010.  It became a big hit in Canada. Channa Sachi Muchi, written and directed by Harinder Gill and starring Miss Pooja and Goldie Somal, was released in August 2010.  Also released in 2010 was Sukhmani (Hope for Life), starring Gurdas Maan, Juhi Chawla & Divya Dutta.

In 2011, the film Ek Noor starring Harshdeep Kaur and Yami Gautam was released. Chhevan Dariya (The Sixth River), directed by Ish Amitoj Kaur, was released in September 2011. Kaur was the first Punjabi woman to have directed, produced, and written a Punjabi film. The film starred Gulshan Grover, Neena Gupta, Manpreet Singh, Lakhwinder Wadali, Christa Cannon and Rana Ranbir.

At the end of the year Chak Jawana was released, directed by Simerjit Singh and starring Gurdas Maan, Jonita Doda in the Lead Roles .

In February 2011, the PTC Punjabi channel organised the first ever PTC Punjabi Film Awards at Panchkula. It was a tremendous boost to the industry and was attended by the likes of Om Puri, Prem Chopra, Gurdas Maan, Guddu Dhanoa, Preeti Sapru, Raza Murad, Satish Kaul, Manmohan Singh, Amrinder Gill, Gippy Grewal, Jasbir Jassi, Puneet Issar, Rakesh Bedi, Rama Vij, Sudhanshu Pandey, and Akriti Kakkar.

2011 looks to be the year when the industry moves away from the "typical NRI-centered" storylines and towards more meaningful and creative storylines with movies like The Lion of Punjab starring Diljit Dosanjh and Dharti starring Rannvijay Singh.

Jihne Mera Dil Luteya is a 2011 Punjabi film directed by Mandeep Kumar with story and screenplay by Dheeraj Rattan, produced by Batra Showbiz Pvt. Ltd. and starring Gippy Grewal, Diljit Dosanjh, Neeru Bajwa, and Jaswinder Bhalla. It grossed 125 million. These films raise the bar of Punjabi films and take Punjabi cinema to next level.

In September 2011, Yaara o Dildaara was released, directed by Ksshitij Chaudhary and starring Harbhajan Mann, Jonita Doda, Tulip Joshi, Kabir Bedi, and Gurpreet Ghuggi.  In October, Yaar Annmulle introducing Yuvraj Hans and Harish Verma was released. This film was a box office hit.

This year was the considered as the golden year of Punjabi cinema and industry reached many milestones in this year by having all India impact. There was the release of Hollywood-style film Mirza – The Untold Story the most costly film in the history of Punjabi cinema in April starring Gippy Grewal and Yo Yo Honey Singh.
In June the film Jatt & Juliet was greatest blockbuster and till now holds the title of best ever film of Punjabi cinema. This film established Diljit Dosanjh and Neeru Bajwa as superstars of Punjabi film industry. In July 2012 out and out comedy film Carry On Jatta starring Gippy Grewal was also blockbuster only after Jatt & Juliet commercially. First time in punjabi cinema sequel of sperhit film Yaaran Naal Baharan, film Yaraan Naal Baharaan 2 was released.

In September, Ajj De Ranjhe starring Deep Dhillon and Kul Sidhu was released. It was directed by Man ji. In October 2012, Saadi Wakhri Hai Shaan, directed by Gurbir Grewal, was released. The film featured eight songs, which were composed by debut music director Dilpreet Bhatia. The film's music was a contemporary fusion of western classical and Punjabi folk music.

This year many new Production houses started the production of too many comedy movies. Binnu Dhillon, Gurpreet Ghuggi, Jaswinder Bhalla, Rana Ranbir, Karamjit Anmol and B.N. Sharma established themselves as greatest comedians of Punjabi industry.

In August 2012, the first ever Punjabi International Film Academy Awards were organised in Toronto, Canada. This was a tremendous success, attended by a host of Punjabi stars. With renewed interest from the public, Punjabi cinema has seen a revival with more releases every year featuring bigger budgets, homegrown stars, and Bollywood actors of Punjabi descent taking part. Also there are film festivals like Punjabi Film Festival, Amritsar, Ma Boli International Punjabi Film Festival, Vancouver and Punjabi International Film Festival, Toronto held annually.

2013 carried the Golden phase of Punjabi movies to the next level. Superstars Gippy Grewal, Neeru Bajwa, Diljit Dosanjh and Surveen Chawla stole the hearts of audiences by their successful films this year.  Jatt & Juliet 2 broke the records of its prequel Jatt & Juliet. Jatt & Juliet 2 was also released in Pakistani Punjab in over 15 screens and was greatly liked by Pakistani audiences.

Sadda Haq, a true story based in the late 1980s and early 1990s during a period of extreme turmoil in Punjab was the second blockbuster of the year 2013 only after Jatt & Juliet 2.
Bhaji in Problem starring Gippy Grewal was another blockbuster of the year produced by Akshay Kumar and also having his extended appearance along with cricketer Harbhajan Singh. Other hit films were Jimmy Shergill's Saadi Love Story starring Diljit Dosanjh, Fer Mamla Gadbad Gadbad starring Roshan Prince and Japji Khaira, Jatts in Golmaal starring Arya Babbar and Samiksha, Tu Mera 22 Main Tera 22 starring Yo Yo Honey Singh and superstar Gippy Grewal's Lucky Di Unlucky Story and action flick Singh vs Kaur. A religious film, Pagri Singh Da Taaj, was also released.

The Hollywood blockbuster A Good Day to Die Hard dubbed in Punjabi with superstar Gippy Grewal's voice was released in Punjab.

Many meaningful films based on social issues and the reality of Punjab were also successful like National Award winner Nabar, Stupid 7 based on student life in Punjab, Chandigarh student politics based Sikander, Sadda Haq, corruption and social issues based Bikkar Bai Sentimental, religious film Dastaar, Punjab Bolda, Haani, and Dil Pardesi Ho Gaya.

This year also saw the production of the first Punjabi 3D feature film, Pehchaan 3D, produced and directed by Manny Parmar.

Irrfan Khan starrer Qissa won four awards in Indian International Film Festival of Queensland of best actor award for Irrfan, best actress award for Tillotama Shome, best director award for Anup Singh and best cinematography for Sebastian Edschmid.

In year 2014, around 42 films were released and nearly 80 percent of those films were all slapstick comedies. Most successful films of the year were blockbusters like Chaar Sahibzaade(3D), Gippy Grewal's Jatt James Bond, Disco Singh, Double Di Trouble, Diljit Dosanjh's Punjab 1984, Mr & Mrs 420, Goreya Nu Daffa Karo. In This year many Action Films were released like Kirpaan: The Sword of Honour, Fateh, Romeo Ranjha, Yoddha The Warrior (2014 film) and Baaz. Released in January, Patiala Dreamz was a romantic thriller, with right doses of action, suspense, romance and comedy. There were many movies touching 1984 subject such as Punjab 1984, Kaum De Heere, 47 to 84 Hun Main Kisnu Watan Kahunga. Other films released in this year were Aa Gaye Munde U.K. De starring Jimmy Shergill and Neeru Bajwa, Mundeyan Ton Bachke Rahin starring Jassi Gill, Roshan Prince and Simran Kaur Mundi, Dil Vil Pyaar Vyaar starring Gurdas Mann and Neeru Bajwa, "Cross Connection" Released on 26 December, Produced by jasbir Dhillon (Dhillon Creations) Starring: B.N. Sharma, Upasna singh, Garry warraich, Nancy johal, Gurchet chitarkar, Parkash gadhu, Dilawar sidhu, Malkeet raouny, Anita shabdeesh, Sahib singh, Raman Dhillon, Rozy, Tarsem paul with renowned singers Rahat fateh ali khan, Arif Lohar, Kamal khan, Navraj hans, Mank-e, Tochi raina.

Also this year many notable actors and singers debuted in Punjabi cinema, this year notably veteran actors Dharmendra and Poonam Dhillon in Double Di Trouble, famous Bollywood comedian Razak Khan in Marriage da garriage, Bollywood actress Zarine Khan in Jatt James Bond, singer Garry Sandhu in Romeo Ranjha.
 
Chaar Sahibzaade was the first Punjabi 3D animated historical drama. It was a blockbuster, grossing over  globally and was made tax free by governments of states like Madhya Pradesh, Delhi, Punjab, Uttrakhand, Uttar Pradesh.

The Canadian-Punjabi feature film Work Weather Wife represented Canada at the 87th Oscar Awards (87th Academy Awards) and it was the only Canadian film that made the final shortlist of 79 Best Original Songs with its songs Moon and Long Braid. At 72nd Golden Globe Awards for Best Foreign Language Feature Film and made the top 53 films in the long list. It stars Harpreet Sandhu and Reema Nagra in the lead role with Dilbag Brar and Kirat Bhattal. It is directed by Harpreet Sandhu.

The year 2015 was attributed to a few directors who took the risk of taking up different subjects with some fresh stories and some fresh actors and villains. Diljit Dosanjh, Neeru Bajwa and Mandy Takhar-starrer Sardaar Ji was blockbuster film and even achieved  milestone gross earning record, according to the film pandits. Second Blockbuster film was Amrinder Gill, Sargun Mehta, Aditi Sharma and Binnu Dhillon starrer, 1945 based rural Punjabi love story Angrej which did very well both in Punjab as well as abroad.

Other flop films were Dildariyaan,  Mitti Na Pharol Jogiya, Oh Yaara Ainvayi Ainvayi Lut Gaya, Munde Kamaal De. While films raking up controversy or inviting a ban were The Mastermind Jinda Sukha and Pata Pata Singhan Da Vairi and Nanak Shah Fakir (Temporarily that faced a ban in some parts of the country).

In 2016, As many as 41 movies were released. Ambarsariya, Sardaar Ji 2, Love Punjab, Vaisakhi List, Channo Kamli Yaar Di, Kaptaan, Saadey CM Saab, Bambukat, Chauthi Koot, Nikka Zaildar were some of the big commercial/critical winners.

In the first half of 2017, New concepts and excellent content paid dividends. Super Singh, Manje Bistre, Jindua, Lahoriye, Sargi, Saab Bahadar, Sarvann, Rabb Da Radio and The Great Sardaar were some of the big commercial/critical winners.
In the second half of the year, Channa Mereya, Sardar Mohammad, Nikka Zaildar 2 and Vekh Baraatan Challiyan were some of the commercial hits.

In the year 2018, the first ever war-based Punjabi movie Sajjan Singh Rangroot, set during World War I and starring Diljit Dosanjh, was released. Carry On Jatta 2 was another blockbuster and one of the highest grossing Punjabi movies of all time. Other commercially successful movies include Golak Bugni Bank Te Batua, Ashke, Laung Laachi and Laavan Phere.

In year 2019, total 61 Punjabi films were released worldwide with superhits like Shadaa, Ardaas Karaan, Chal Mera Putt, Muklawa, Manje Bistre 2, Nikka Zaildar 3, Singham, Rabb Da Radio 2, Dil Diyaan Gallan, Blackia, Laiye Je Yaarian, Chandigarh Amritsar Chandigarh, Kaka Ji and Band Vajje. Harjeeta won two awards for Best Punjabi Film and Best Child Actor at 66th National Film Awards. Song Laung Laachi from Laung Laachi film became the first Indian song to reach one billion views on YouTube.

 Festivals 

 Film distribution and production companies 
Notable Punjabi film distribution and/or production companies include:
 Inside Motion Pictures
 Cine Heights
 Geet Mp3
 White Hill Studio
 Humble Motion Pictures
 Studio 7 Production Canada & USA
 Shri Narotam Ji Productions
 Vehli Janta Films
 Villagers Film Studio
 Naughty Men Productions
 Dream Reality Films
 Unisys Infosolutions Pvt Ltd/Saga Music Pvt Ltd

Distribution
 

Prior to the late-1900s, Punjabi film companies were largely immersed in the competition for the domestic market. Limited to East Punjab and West Punjab and low number of screens in Punjabi-speaking areas of Delhi and Rajasthan (Sri Ganganagar, Hanumangarh) and no prospect in metro cities, distribution was a problem for Punjabi filmmakers. It was difficult to compete with the huge demand for films created by Bollywood. Gradually, Punjabi companies moved to the Australasian, European and North American markets.

In recent years, Canada has become a popular destination for shooting Punjabi films and is the second largest market of Punjabi cinema. About 50 percent of the revenue for all successful Punjabi films are generated from the overseas markets, including Australia, Canada, Malaysia, New Zealand, United Kingdom and United States. A number of Punjabi films have also surpassed the gross collections of Bollywood films in the overseas markets. Punjabi films are finding more releases in Punjabi-dominated areas of South Asia, including East Punjab, West Punjab, Delhi, Haryana, Himachal Pradesh, Uttarakhand (Rudrapur, Bajpur, Kashipur) and Jammu. Punjabi films are also distributed to less-Punjabi populated regions, including states of India: Bengaluru, Gujarat, Hyderabad, Kolkata, Madhya Pradesh, Nanded, Odisha, Bihar and countries: Austria, Belgium, France, Germany, Hong Kong, Italy, Malaysia, Netherlands, Pakistan (other than West Punjab) and Singapore. Punjabi cinema makes zero money from satellite or music due to absence of a sustainable satellite mechanism.

At the home territory, Punjab, against only 4 multiplexes in all of East Punjab in 2007, as of 2014 the numbers have increased to 36 with 99 more approved by the Government of Punjab, India for construction. These in turn have attracted a large middle class audience for Punjabi films which did not exist before.

Parallel cinema
Punjabi film industry has established Parallel Cinema in these years also. 
The National Award-winning Marhi Da Deeva (1989) mercilessly explores the issues of economic inequality, social segregation in life of dalit farm labourers and other landless communities in Punjab. 
Another National Award winner, Anhe Ghore Da Daan (2011) diligently puts across the distressed and frustrated life-cycle of marginalised Dalits in Punjab. It is the first Punjabi-language film to have travelled to so many international film festivals. The film premiered in the Orizzonti section (Horizons) at the 68th Venice International Film Festival. It won the Special Jury Award and the $50,000 Black Pearl trophy at the Abu Dhabi Film Festival. It was also shown at the 55th BFI London Film Festival, 49th New York Film Festival and the 16th Busan International Film Festival. The film also won the Golden Peacock award for best film at the 43rd International Film Festival of India (IFFI) 2012 held in Panaji, Goa.
Khamosh Pani (2003) is a tragic story of widowed mother and her young son set in a late 1970s village in West Punjab and relations of communities after 1947 Partition of Punjab starring Kiron Kher and Shilpa Shukla.

Short films
Nooran (2013), based on famous Punjabi author, Balwant Gargi's story Rabbo Marasan, which represents a woman's emotions, Directed by Navtej Sandhu, was sent for Cannes Film Festival-Short Film Corner.
Kambdi Deorri (The Shivering Gateway) (2014), based on famous Punjabi author, Jaswant Singh Kanwal's story Akk the Amrit, which shows the deteriorating situation of ties within families, Directed by Navtej Sandhu, was again sent for Cannes Film Festival-Short Film Corner.
The Half Ticket (2018), which was based on a true love story in which the needs of the world overshadow true love, is written and directed by Channa Rai, and stars Victor John. was in Nominated for Best Director at Pune Film Festival-2018.
Sutta Naag (2014), adapted from Sahitya Akademi Award winner Punjabi writer, Late Ram Sarup Ankhi's short story of same name. The narrative portrays 50 years old Punjab and addresses serious subjects like infidelity and the suppression of women has been premiered at Punjabi International Film Festival, Toronto.
Khoon (2015), film based on Gurbachan Singh Bhullar's Short story was shown at the Punjabi International Film Festival, Toronto.
Daughter of the Bin (2015), based on famous Play writer, Dr. Jatinder Brar's play, which shows the plight of the newly born girl child thrown in the dustbin and adopted by a beggar, award-winning short film.
Gawachi Pagg (The Lost Turban) (2016), based on famous Punjabi writer, Jaswant Singh Kanwal's story, a very emotional and powerful story of an innocent young boy who was looking for his "Lost Esteem" during the militancy period in the era of 80s' in Punjab, internationally critically acclaimed short film Directed by Navtej Sandhu.
Zindagi A life of Kinner (2012), based on the story of Jagdev Dhillon, talks about the lives of the third gender, Eunuch (Hijra). The film was directed by Harman Aggarwal and was showcased in Punjabi International Film Festival, Toronto and Delhi International Film Festival.
Heer Unstoppable (2017) Based on the Plight of women in Punjab who are married to NRI's without any Background check. The Film was official selection to Five International Film Festivals with winning Best Director for Jonita Doda at Pink city International Film Festival.
RAIN (Simran Sidhu, 2017) is the story of a farmer (Bittu Bajwa) on the verge of suicide as he waits for it to rain.  The winner of six international awards (including one for Best Drama at Festigious L.A. and a Remi Award, whose previous recipients include Hollywood legends Steven Spielberg, Francis Ford Coppola and George Lucas), writer-director Simran Sidhu's mini-epic also boasts a sweeping score by the world renowned Indonesian composer Elwin Hendrijanto, and guest stars Yashpal Sharma who was so fond of the script that he did the film for free.
Bhulekha (2018), based on famous Punjabi author, Jaswant Singh Kanwal's story Vehan paye Dariya, beautiful love story with very different kind of misunderstanding, Directed by Navtej Sandhu.

Highest-grossing Punjabi films (worldwide)

 Awards 

 Filmfare Awards
 PTC Punjabi Film Awards
 Brit Asia Film Awards

 Personalities 

 Directors 
 InsideAKY
 Himanshu Dhar
 Gaurav Manku
 Dev Choudhary
 Amberdeep Singh
 Amitoj Maan
 Amit Prasher
 Anurag Singh
 Baljit Singh Deo
 Balwant Dullat
 Channa Rai
 Chitrarth Singh
 Gippy Grewal
 VFX Navi
 Mohit Dhandha
 Manan Taneja
 Harry Baweja
 Jagdeep Sidhu
 Ksshitij Chaudhary
 Manbhavan Singh
 Manmord Sidhu
 Manmohan Singh
 Manoj Punj
  Navalpreet Rangi
 Neeru Bajwa
 Nidhi.M. Singh
 Pali Bhupinder Singh
 Pankaj Batra
 Rohit Jugraj Chauhan
 Simerjit Singh
 Smeep Kang
 Sukh Sanghera
 Sukhminder Dhanjal

 Actors 

The Punjabi film industry has produced a number of successful actors, actresses, writers, directors and filmmakers, many of whom have been known internationally.

 InsideAKY
 B.N. Sharma
 Gugu Gill
 Harish Verma
 Jaswinder Bhalla
 Karamjit Anmol
 Nav Bajwa
 Ranjit Bawa
 Shavinder Mahal
 Sardar SohiActresses'

 Himanshi Khurana
 Japji Khaira
 Juhi Chawla
 Kulraj Randhawa
 Mahi Gill
 Monica Gill
 Nimrat Khaira
 Nirmal Rishi
 Simi Chahal
 Wamiqa Gabbi

See also

 List of cinema of the world
 List of Punjabi films
 List of highest-grossing Punjabi films
 Lists of Indian Punjabi films

References

 
 
Punjabi language
Cinema by language of India
Punjabi